Angelique and the Sultan (French: Angélique et le Sultan) is a 1968 historical adventure film directed by Bernard Borderie and starring Michèle Mercier, Robert Hossein and Jean-Claude Pascal. It was made as a co-production between France, Italy and West Germany. It was the last entry in the five film series based on the novels by Anne and Serge Golon. A planned sixth film Angelique the Rebel was announced but never made.

The film's sets were designed by the art director Robert Giordani. It was shot at Cinecittà Studios in Rome.

Cast
 Michèle Mercier as Angélique de Peyrac 
 Robert Hossein as Jeoffrey de Peyrac 
 Jean-Claude Pascal as Osman Ferradji 
 Jacques Santi as Vateville 
 Helmuth Schneider as Colin Paturel 
 Roger Pigaut as le Marquis d'Escrainville 
 Ettore Manni as Jason 
 Erno Crisa as Turkish Ambassador 
 Bruno Dietrich as Corlano 
 Pasquale Martino as Savary 
 Renato De Carmine as Jason 
 Henri Cogan as Bolbec 
 Aly Ben Ayed as the Sultan 
 Gaby Mesée as favourite of the Sultan
 Vilma Lindamar as Leïla Aïcha
 Manja Golec as the European prisoner in the harem
 Sieghardt Rupp as Millerand

Production
Michèle Mercier said that during the shooting in Tunisia, Habib Jr, the son of President Habib Bourgiba, came to attend the famous scene where she is whipped. "The last day of the shooting, he made give a party in my honor. Some young girls brought me a bellydancer's costume and said: 'The president's son wants you to dance with us tonight.' They try to put silver bracelets on my feet. They are so tight that it takes oil to make them slip off. The evening went well, but afterwards, once I was alone in my room, it was impossible to remove the bracelets. I had to sleep with them on. I kept them as a souvenir," Mercier said.

References

Bibliography
 Bergfelder, Tim. International Adventures: German Popular Cinema and European Co-Productions in the 1960s. Berghahn Books, 2005.
 Klossner, Michael. The Europe of 1500-1815 on Film and Television: A Worldwide Filmography of Over 2550 Works, 1895 Through 2000. McFarland & Company, 2002.

External links 
 

1968 films
1960s historical romance films
French historical romance films
West German films
Films directed by Bernard Borderie
Films set in the 1670s
Films based on French novels
Films based on historical novels
Films based on romance novels
Italian sequel films
Italian historical romance films
Films shot in Tunisia
Gloria Film films
Films shot at Cinecittà Studios
1960s French-language films
1960s French films
1960s Italian films